Richard Hind Cambage   (7 November 1859 – 28 November 1928) was an Australian surveyor and botanist who made important contributions to the description of the genera Acacia and Eucalyptus.

Early life
Cambage, son of John Fisher Cambage, was born at Applegarth near Milton, New South Wales. He was educated at state and private schools (including Ulladulla Public School), and for a short time was a teacher at the Milton State School. In 1878 he became an assistant to M. J. Callaghan, surveyor, and took part in the survey of National Park in 1879 and 1880. On 11 July 1881 at the Elizabeth Street registry office, Sydney, he married Fanny Skillman (d.1897), daughter of the headteacher at Ulladulla.

Surveying career
He qualified as a licensed surveyor in June 1882, was engaged in the Department of Lands for three years as a draftsman and then entered the department of mines as a mining surveyor on 16 February 1885. In 1900 he carried out a difficult and dangerous survey of abandoned Newcastle workings running under the harbour and sea-bed. In 1902 was appointed chief mining surveyor and investigated the site of the Mount Kembla mining disaster which killed 96 men and boys. Cambage's evidence to the royal commission on the disaster led to the reversal of the coroner's verdict that the miners had died of carbon monoxide poisoning. He was chief mining surveyor until 1 January 1916, when he was made under-secretary of the mines department. He retired from the public service on 7 November 1924.

Although a busy public servant he contrived to carry on a large amount of other work and cultivated many interests. Front 1909 to 1915 he lectured on surveying at Sydney Technical College, was on three occasions elected president of the Institution of Surveyors, and was for 15 years a member of its board of examiners.

Botany career
He had early become much interested in geology and botany, and between 1901 and 1903 contributed to the Linnean Society a series of "Notes on the Botany of the Interior of New South Wales" of which as "Notes on the Native Flora of New South Wales", a further long series was published over a period of more than 20 years. He was secretary of the Royal Society of New South Wales from 1914 to 1922 and from 1925 to 1928 and was president in 1912 and 1923.

He was a member of the council of the Linnean Society of New South Wales from 1906 and was its president in 1924. He was honorary secretary of the Australian National Research Council from its inception in 1919 until 1926, and organized the second pan-Pacific science congress held in Melbourne and Sydney in 1923. He was its president from 1926 to 1928 and he was elected president of the Australasian Association for the Advancement of Science In 1928. He was also president of the New South Wales forest league and did much work for the Australian wattle league. In spite of the time spent on administrative work Cambage was able to make valuable contributions to science. For many years he systematically planted seeds of Acacia, and at the time of his death had contributed 13 papers to the Journal of the Royal Society with descriptions of 130 species, and he also did some papers on the eucalypts. As a member of the Royal Australian Historical Society his knowledge of surveying and bushcraft enabled him to throw light on the journeys of some of the early explorers. A paper on Exploration Beyond the Upper Nepean in 1798, was published separately as a pamphlet in 1920. He died suddenly on 28 November 1928.

Acacia cambagei and Eucalyptus cambageana were named after him.

References

McMinn, W.G. Cambage, Richard Hind (1859–1928), Australian Dictionary of Biography, Volume 7, MUP, 1979, pp 529–530.

20th-century Australian botanists
Australian surveyors
Australian taxonomists
1859 births
1928 deaths
Members of the Linnean Society of New South Wales
Commanders of the Order of the British Empire
19th-century Australian botanists